Gábor Varga (born 20 August 1985 in Csorna) is a Hungarian football player who currently plays for FC Ajka on loan from Szombathelyi Haladás.

References
HLSZ
Lombard FC Papa Official Website
UEFA Official Website

1985 births
Living people
People from Csorna
Hungarian footballers
Association football defenders
Győri ETO FC players
Gyirmót FC Győr players
Lombard-Pápa TFC footballers
Vasas SC players
Soproni VSE players
Szombathelyi Haladás footballers
FC Ajka players
Nemzeti Bajnokság I players
Sportspeople from Győr-Moson-Sopron County